Neumann's grass rat (Arvicanthis neumanni)  is a species of rodent in the family Muridae.
It is found in Ethiopia, Somalia, Sudan, Tanzania, and possibly Kenya.
Its natural habitats are dry savanna and subtropical or tropical dry shrubland.

References

 Boitani, L. 2004.  Arvicanthis somalicus.   2006 IUCN Red List of Threatened Species.   Downloaded on 19 July 2007.

Arvicanthis
Mammals described in 1894
Taxonomy articles created by Polbot